The 2010–11 KFC Twenty20 Big Bash was the sixth season of the KFC Twenty20 Big Bash, the official Twenty20 domestic cricket competition in Australia. Six teams representing six states in Australia participated in the competition. The competition began on 30 December 2010. It was won by South Australia, who defeated New South Wales in the final.

This season used a new format comprising 18 regular matches, a preliminary final and a final. This format had 3 additional regular matches to the 2009–10 season.

Table
Teams received 2 points for a win, 1 for a tie or no result, and 0 for a loss. At the end of the regular matches the teams ranked two and three play each other in the preliminary final at the home venue of the team ranked two. The winner of the preliminary final earns the right to play the first placed team in the final at the home venue of the first placed team.  In the event of several teams finishing with the same number of points, standings are determined by most wins, then net run rate (NRR).

The two teams that make the final will qualify for the 2011 Champions League Twenty20 tournament.

Teams

 *Signed on full contract i.e. able to play other forms of cricket for the state

Fixtures
Scores are listed in the Australian format of wickets/runs.

Round 1

Round 2

Round 3

Round 4

Round 5

Round 6

Knockout stage

Preliminary final

Final

Statistics

Highest team totals
The following table lists the six highest team scores during this season.

Last Updated 25 January 2011.

Most runs
The top five highest run scorers (total runs) in the season are included in this table.

Last Updated 1 February 2011.

Highest scores
This table contains the top five highest scores of the season made by a batsman in a single innings.

Last Updated 25 January 2011.

Most wickets
The following table contains the five leading wicket-takers of the season.

Best bowling figures
This table lists the top five players with the best bowling figures in the season.

Media coverage

Television

Fox Sports (live) – Australia
Star Cricket (live) – India, Sri Lanka, Pakistan
SKY Sport (live) – New Zealand
Supersport (live) – South Africa

References

External links
Tournament Page – Cricket Australia
Tournament Page – ESPN CricInfo

KFC Twenty20 Big Bash seasons
KFC Twenty20 Big Bash
KFC